Clive Ernest Reid (20 April 1922 – 7 March 1972) was an Australian rules footballer who played with Collingwood in the Victorian Football League (VFL).

Reid served in the Royal Australian Navy during World War II.

Notes

External links 

Profile on Collingwood Forever

1922 births
1972 deaths
Australian rules footballers from Victoria (Australia)
Collingwood Football Club players
Coburg Football Club players